James Pine (1885-1953) was a vice admiral in the United States Coast Guard and Superintendent of the United States Coast Guard Academy.

Biography
Pine was born on October 19, 1885 in Cincinnati, Ohio. He died on February 21, 1953.

Career
Pine was commissioned an ensign in the United States Revenue Cutter Service in 1908. The following year, he was stationed in Milwaukee, Wisconsin.

In 1913, Pine was assigned to the USRC Seminole. Later, he commanded the USS Fanning (DD-37), the USS Wainwright (DD-62), the USCGC Itasca and the USCGC George M. Bibb (WPG-31). In 1939, the Revenue Cutter Service merged with the United States Life-Saving Service to form the Coast Guard.

Pine became Superintendent of the Coast Guard Academy in 1940. While there, he received the Legion of Merit for his performance during World War II. He remained in the position until his retirement in 1947.

Personal life

Admiral Pine was married to Ysabel Cooper Pine (1894–1982), a daughter of the Republic of Hawaii's co-founder, Judge Henry E. Cooper, and was survived by a son and two daughters. Their eldest child, artist Barbara Alice Pine Ramage (1913–2002), was married to US Navy Vice Admiral Lawson P. ("Red") Ramage, a famed submarine commander.

Pine and his wife are buried at Arlington National Cemetery along with their sons James Francis Pine (1920–1935) and Robert Beekman Pine (1923–2009).

References

1885 births
1953 deaths
Military personnel from Cincinnati
United States Revenue Cutter Service officers
United States Coast Guard personnel of World War II
United States Coast Guard admirals
Recipients of the Legion of Merit
Burials at Arlington National Cemetery